Strikeforce: At The Dome was a mixed martial arts event promoted by Strikeforce in conjunction with Brian Halquist Productions. The event took place at the Tacoma Dome in Tacoma, Washington on Saturday, February 23, 2008.

The event marked the North American MMA debut of Bob Sapp.

Results

See also 
 Strikeforce (mixed martial arts)
 List of Strikeforce champions
 List of Strikeforce events
 2008 in Strikeforce

References

External links
Strikeforce Official website

At the Dome
2008 in mixed martial arts
Mixed martial arts in Washington (state)
Sports in Tacoma, Washington
2008 in sports in Washington (state)